Igi is a short story written by the Georgian writer Jemal Karchkhadze, first published in 1977. The story Igi  is one of the most acclaimed works of the author and since 2006 has been included in school textbooks of Georgian Language and Literature.

Plot 
Igi is a prehistoric story, taking readers to a period when the very first artist and thinker discovers a method to create images. In the routine life of prehistoric society comes a moment when one person, named Igi, starts to ask questions that no one has ever asked before. A feeling of wonder pervades his body and mind and he tries to discover secrets unnoticed by the rest.  However, in a closed society, any original perception of life is unacceptable. The Chief and his followers will never welcome a member with a different way of thinking, and conflict arises between a progressive mentality and brute force. Igi has to follow a hard and painful way of solitude in order to gain free will and find the essence of being. The vivid narration reveals a very strange world, where feelings often seem bizarre, and where one can find many answers to questions that still preoccupy mankind.

References 

1977 short stories
Georgian-language works
Novels by Jemal Karchkhadze
Fiction set in prehistory
Philosophical novels